Kalle Haapasalmi (3 November 1926 – 2 May 2006) was a Finnish wrestler. He competed in the men's Greco-Roman lightweight at the 1952 Summer Olympics.

References

External links
 

1926 births
2006 deaths
Finnish male sport wrestlers
Olympic wrestlers of Finland
Wrestlers at the 1952 Summer Olympics
People from Ilmajoki
Sportspeople from South Ostrobothnia